Hareem Farooq (born 26 May 1992) is a Pakistani theatre, film and television actress and a film producer, known for her work in the serial Diyar-e-Dil and Pawnay 14 August. She co-produced Janaan followed by her 2018 film Parchi. She is the first female celebrity to get the honor of hosting Pakistan Super League in the same year.

Early life
Hareem Farooq was born on May 26, 1992, in Islamabad and spent most of her time in that city before she moved with her family to Karachi. Her parents are both doctors, her father being a public health PhD and international consultant while her mother is a dermatologist. The actress received early education from Karachi Grammar School. She did her bachelor's degree in Sociology and Journalism from Quaid-e-Azam University, Islamabad, after which she began her career in acting.

Singer Abdullah Qureshi is her cousin.

Career
Hareem Farooq began her career in the year 2012 in theatre playing the leading role of Fatima Jinnah in Pawnay 14 August and Kiran in Aangan Terha. The following year, she made her big screen debut with a leading role in the 2013 horror thriller film Siyaah. Hareem made her television debut with Mausam alongside Ahsan Khan and Yumna Zaidi in 2014 on the Pakistani top TV Channel Hum TV. After her first drama becoming the super hit, she has given many popular dramas to the showbiz industry like Doorsri Biwi and Mere Humdum Mere Dost and Diyar-e-Dil in 2015. Farooq was also part of the television drama Sanam. In the same year, she played the lead role in the film Dobara Phir Se and was a co-producer of the feature film Janaan where she also appeared in a cameo role. She appeared in the comedy flick Parchi as the lead role in which she played the character of a female don, with co-stars Ali Rehman Khan, Ahmed Ali Akbar and Usman Mukhtar in lead roles.

In addition to a successful and growing acting career, in 2015, Farooq took over an additional hat of becoming Pakistan’s first female actor-producer, by joining her childhood best friend and producer of her debut film, Imran Raza Kazmi as a partner in IRK Films and went on to produce Janaan with him, followed by her 2018 blockbuster Parchi.

In the year 2018, she also went into forming a global entertainment company, IHA Entertainment with Arif Lakhani and Imran Raza Kazmi, which soon entered into an agreement with top entertainment in Kingdom of Saudi Arabia (KSA), as the first distribution firm.

Hareem is also the first female celebrity to get the honor of hosting The Pakistan Super League in February 2018, where she hosted the 3rd PSL opening ceremony in Dubai.

She has also signed on to become the official Spokesperson for Loreal Professional, Pakistan in 2017.

Filmography

Films

Television

Accolades

References

External links

 

Actresses from Islamabad
Quaid-i-Azam University alumni
21st-century Pakistani actresses
Living people
Pakistani film actresses
Pakistani television actresses
Pakistani film producers
Actresses in Urdu cinema
1989 births
Karachi Grammar School alumni